Moussa Germain Sanou (born 26 May 1992) is a Burkinabé professional footballer who plays as a goalkeeper for  club Paris 13 Atletico.

Club career
Sanou has played in Burkino Faso for Centre Saint-Étienne Bobo, and in France for Saint-Étienne B, Drancy, Beauvais, and Paris 13 Atletico.

International career 
He played at the 2009 African U-17 Championship and the 2009 FIFA U-17 World Cup, and made his senior international debut for Burkina Faso in 2010. He was selected as part of Burkina Faso's preliminary squad for the 2015 Africa Cup of Nations.

Career statistics

Club

Honours 
Paris 13 Atletico

 Championnat National 2: 2021–22

References

1992 births
Living people
Association football goalkeepers
Burkinabé footballers
Burkina Faso international footballers
Burkina Faso youth international footballers
2010 Africa Cup of Nations players
2012 Africa Cup of Nations players
2013 Africa Cup of Nations players
2015 Africa Cup of Nations players
2017 Africa Cup of Nations players
AS Saint-Étienne players
JA Drancy players
AS Beauvais Oise players
Paris 13 Atletico players
Championnat National 2 players
Championnat National 3 players
Burkinabé expatriate footballers
Burkinabé expatriates in France
Expatriate footballers in France
People from Bobo-Dioulasso
21st-century Burkinabé people